Clarence Park is the debut studio album by IDM musician Chris Clark. It was released on April 2, 2001 by Warp Records.

The album is named after Clarence Park, a public park in Clark's home town of St Albans.

Track listing

References 

2001 albums
Clark (musician) albums
Warp (record label) albums